Samba Sow may refer to:

 Samba Sow (footballer, born 1984), Senegalese footballer 
 Samba Sow (footballer, born 1989), Malian footballer 
 Samba O. Sow, World Health Organization director general of the Center for Vaccine Development in Mali (CVD-Mali)